Ten cents or Ten Cents may refer to:
 10 cent coin,  a coinage value in many systems using decimal currencies
 Ten Cents (TUGS), a fictional character in children's television series, TUGS
 Tencent, Chinese company